Mur may refer to:

Places:
 Mur (river) (or Mura), a river in central Europe
 Mur, Switzerland, a commune in Vaud and Avenches
 Mur (Novi Pazar), a large village in Serbia
 Mur, part of the village of Murzasichle, Poland
 Mur, Iran (disambiguation)

Other uses:
 Mur (cuneiform), a cuneiform sign
 An abbreviation for muramic acid
 mur, ISO 639-3 code for the Murle language, spoken in South Sudan
 Mur Lafferty (born 1973), American podcaster and writer
 Mona Mur, German singer born Sabine Bredy in 1960

MUR may refer to:
 Mauritian rupee, by ISO 4217 currency code
 Medicine use review, UK service
 Melbourne University Regiment of the Australian Army Reserve
 Michigan United Railways, US, 1906-1924
 Mouvements Unis de la Résistance, a French Resistance group active from 1943
 M.U.R., a Lebanese resistance group in the 1990s
 Criminal Investigation Department (Russian: МУР, Московский уголовный розыск) of the Moscow City Police
 Artistic Ukrainian Movement (Ukrainian: МУР, Мистецький український рух), a Ukrainian displaced persons' literary organisation active 1945-1948

See also
 Le Mur (disambiguation)
 Murs (disambiguation)
 Mura (disambiguation)
 Murre (bird)